iZombie, originally titled I, Zombie, is a comic book series created by writer Chris Roberson and artist Michael Allred, published by DC Comics' Vertigo imprint beginning in 2010. The series deals with Gwen Dylan (née Gwendolyn Price), a revenant gravedigger in Eugene, Oregon and her friends Ellie, a 1960s ghost, and Scott, a were-terrier. iZombie was nominated for the 2011 Eisner Award for Best New Series.

Gwen Dylan can pass for a regular girl, but she needs to eat a brain once a month to keep from losing her memories and intelligence. As a gravedigger, she has plenty of access to recently deceased people; when she consumes their brains she "inherits" part of the deceased's thoughts.

The "monsters" in iZombie are explained via the concepts of over- and undersoul. The oversoul (as in Ralph Waldo Emerson's "The Over-Soul") is "seated in the brain, contains the thoughts, memories, and personality", while the undersoul (as in Michael McClure's poem "Dark Brown") is "seated in the heart, contains the appetites, emotions and fears". Ghosts are thus bodiless oversouls; poltergeists, bodiless undersouls; vampires bodies without undersouls (thirsting for emotions); and zombies, bodies without oversouls. Revenants, like Gwen, are unique in that they possess both oversouls and undersouls. Souls can also "infect" the living, which accounts for the possessed, werewolves and the like. The characters of iZombie first appeared in a short story in the first House of Mystery Halloween Annual (2009). An iZombie story was also included in the second House of Mystery Halloween Annual (2010).

The comic is notable for its use of real Eugene-area locations as settings, including the University of Oregon campus, the Shelton McMurphey Johnson House, the McDonald Theater, Eugene City Hall, and Ya-Po-Ah Terrace, as well as Portland's Oregon Convention Center and Oregon Zoo. The primary hangout spot, "Dixie's Firehouse", is also known as "Fins" and is located in Springfield, Oregon.

On April 1, 2012, at the Emerald City Comicon, Allred announced that iZombie would end as of #28 in August.

Synopsis
Various entities, some human, some not, battle various escalating threats in and around Eugene, Oregon. Vampires, parental fights, zombies, romance triangles, cabin fever, delayed apocalyptic battles and technical support are just some of the situations under-prepared, heavily manipulated, not-quite-human twenty-somethings have to deal with.

Characters

Gwendolyn "Gwen" Dylan (née Price): The main protagonist, a revenant or main "zombie".
Eleanor "Ellie" Stuart (née Roosevelt): A ghost who died in the 1960s and had never left Oregon.
Scott "Spot": A were-terrier, friend to Gwen and Ellie.
Gavin Price: Gwen's brother and Scott's prospective boyfriend (later husband as of iZombie #28).
Horatio: A monster hunter and Gwen's boyfriend.
Vincent Tan: A friend and co-worker of Scott.
Ashok Patel: A friend and co-worker of Scott and Vincent.
John Amon: A mummy who was responsible for Gwen Dylan becoming a zombie.

Adaptation

In November 2013, The CW ordered a pilot episode named after the comic from writer/producers Rob Thomas and Diane Ruggiero-Wright, who developed the property as a supernatural procedural drama for the network. On February 25, 2014, Deadline reported that Malcolm Goodwin, Aly Michalka and David Anders were cast as Clive, Peyton and Blaine. On March 7, 2014, actor Robert Buckley was cast as Major, the lead character's former fiancé, an environmental engineer and former college football star who is extremely likable. On March 12, 2014, actress Rose McIver was cast as the lead character Olivia "Liv" Moore.
iZombie had been picked up for the 2014-2015 fall season by The CW on May 8, 2014, but was pushed back to air as a mid-season replacement. It debuted on The CW on March 17, 2015 and concluded on August 1, 2019 with 71 episodes airing in total.

While the series retains the lead character's ability to absorb memories and abilities through eating brains, her backstory is substantially changed. Liv (changed from Gwen) is a medical intern in Seattle, Washington who is turned into a zombie after being scratched by one. The series picks up five months after the incident; Liv now works as a King County morgue assistant, along with Dr. Ravi Chakrabarti played by Rahul Kohli, which provides her with a steady supply of brains from murder victims which she must eat in order to retain her intelligence. A side effect of eating brains is that she experiences the deceased's memories in the form of visions, and temporarily absorbs their habits and abilities which she uses to assist in solving crimes.

Michael Allred, co-creator and lead artist for the comic book series, designed and drew the opening credits for the series.

Collected editions
The series has been collected into a number of trade paperbacks:

As well as an omnibus collecting the entire run:

References

External links

Zombies in comics
2010 comics debuts
Vertigo Comics titles
DC Comics franchises
Comics adapted into television series
Human-zombie romance in fiction
Cultural depictions of Abraham Lincoln
DC Comics vampires
Ghosts in written fiction
Fiction about mummies
Therianthropy
Comics set in Oregon
Paranormal romance comics